Borovskoye Shosse is a station on the Kalininsko-Solntsevskaya line of the Moscow Metro. It opened on August 30, 2018 as part of line's Ramenki - Rasskazovka extension.

It is in the Novo-Peredelkino District of Moscow at the intersection of Prirechnaya Ulitsa and Borovskoye Shosse, after which the station takes its name.

References

Moscow Metro stations
Kalininsko-Solntsevskaya line
Railway stations in Russia opened in 2018
Railway stations located underground in Russia